Overwhelmed is a single from the Christian rock group Big Daddy Weave. It debuted at No. 31 and peaked at No. 3 on the Billboard Christian Airplay chart.

Music video
The music video for the single "Overwhelmed" was released on August 7, 2014. The video features shots of animals and African children. At the end of the video, the band performs in front of them.

Charts

Weekly charts

Year-end charts

Certifications

References

2014 songs
Big Daddy Weave songs